The following articles are lists of human Y-chromosome DNA haplogroups found in populations around the world.

Y-DNA haplogroups by ethnic group
Y-DNA haplogroups in populations of Europe
Y-DNA haplogroups in populations of the Near East
Y-DNA haplogroups in populations of North Africa
Y-DNA haplogroups in populations of Sub-Saharan Africa
Y-DNA haplogroups in populations of the Caucasus
Y-DNA haplogroups in populations of South Asia
Y-DNA haplogroups in populations of East and Southeast Asia
Y-DNA haplogroups in populations of Central and North Asia
Y-DNA haplogroups in populations of Oceania
Y-DNA haplogroups in indigenous peoples of the Americas
List of haplogroups of historic people

See also

Recent African origin of modern humans
Genetic history of the Middle East
Genetics and archaeogenetics of South Asia
Genetic history of Europe
Genetic history of Italy
Genetic history of North Africa
Genetic history of Indigenous peoples of the Americas
Genetic history of the Iberian Peninsula
Genetic history of the British Isles
Genetic studies on Jews

External links
ISOGG Y-DNA Haplogroup Tree
Map of Y Haplogroups
Y-DNA Ethnographic and Genographic Atlas and Open-Source Data Compilation

+
Genetics by country
Y